Falcon High School is located in Falcon, Colorado, just east of Colorado Springs and was the first high school in Falcon School District 49. The other two high schools in the district, Sand Creek High School, and Vista Ridge High School were formed in 1997 when Falcon High School was split.

Athletics
Falcon High School is a member of the Pikes Peak Athletic Conference, Class 4A (varies by sport).  It competes in men's football, cross country, golf, soccer, basketball, bowling, swimming, wrestling, track, baseball, women's softball, volleyball, basketball, and power lifting.

2007 Falcon football season
The Falcon football team were 3A state runner-ups in 2007.

Girls softball team
The 2008–2009 girls softball team qualified for the State Tournament for the first time in the school's history.

Notable alumni 

Kalen Ballage (class of 2014), NFL Running Back for the Pittsburgh Steelers.

References

External links

Schools in El Paso County, Colorado
Public high schools in Colorado
Educational institutions established in 1996
1996 establishments in Colorado